"Hotel" is a song by American rapper Kid Ink. The song was released as an instant-grat on January 9, 2015 by Tha Alumni Music Group, 88 Classic and RCA Records, later becoming the second single from his third studio album Full Speed (2015). It was sent to US urban adult contemporary radio on January 27, 2015.

Background 
After the commercial success of their previous single "Show Me", Kid Ink linked up with American singer Chris Brown to work on a song with songwriting and production team The Featherstones. At first the song was displayed as "track 5" (while the rest of the tracks were titled) on the iTunes Store album pre-order before it was released commercially as a single.

Music video 
An animated music video was uploaded to Vevo on June 9, 2015.

Charts

Certifications

References 

2015 singles
2015 songs
Kid Ink songs
Chris Brown songs
Songs written by Chris Brown
RCA Records singles
American songs
Songs written by Kid Ink